Paulo Costa Lima is a Brazilian composer and music theorist, a member of the Brazilian Academy of Music (created by Villa-Lobos in 1945), whose main interest has been the vivid interaction between composition and culture, including the political aspects of it, namely, composition as a way of resisting colonization, against the "waste of experience"  - the traditional circuit in which ideas (theory) are produced elsewhere and absorbed by the South. Born in Salvador-Bahia in 1954, he has always cultivated an interest in Afro-Brazilian musical heritage. He is also a member of the Academia de Letras da Bahia (created in 1917), a founder-member of the Academia de Ciências da Bahia (created in 2011) and a recognized researcher by the CNPq, the National Council for Research (since 2003). In 2015 he was indicated as first prize winner of the Bienal de Música Brasileira Contemporânea, after a consultation involving 120 Brazilian composers and conductors. He has published books and articles on subjects such as the theory and pedagogy of musical composition, analysis and history of Brazilian contemporary music, analysis of Brazilian popular songs, and the possible dialogue between music and psychoanalysis, and also cultural semantics. His works have received more than 600 performances in more than 25 countries in important concert halls such as Konzerthaus Berlin, Carnegie Hall, Lincoln Center, Benaroya Hall, De Rode Pomp, Sala Cecilia Meireles, Sala São Paulo, Teatro Castro Alves and Reitoria da UFBA. In 2001 The New Grove Dictionary of Music and Musicians included an article dedicated to his work, written by Gerard Béhague. He has received along the last decades more than twenty prizes and commissions.

Life and career
He belongs to the second generation of the movement initiated by the ‘Group of Composers of Bahia’ that was formed in 1966, launching a one-line manifesto “In principle, we are against all and every asserted principle”. This manifesto also implies that all suggestions are valid and acceptable, and this inclusivity reflects the cultural diversity and relativity of Bahia - a society created by the encounter and conflict of three civilizations (European, African and Native American). Since 1992 his compositional interests addressed the rhythmic tradition of Afro-Bahian candomblé, creating universes of hybridization and contradiction, non-sequitur and humor, involving Afro-Bahian and Avant-Garde contexts and ideas. Writing about the Atotô do L'homme armé op. 39, a representative piece written in 1993, Ilza Nogueira states that "what can be observed is a procedure of fusion of the appropriated elements (the melodic line and the rhythmic pattern), which compromises their identities and displaces them from their original signifying contexts".

After studying composition with Lindembergue Cardoso and Ernst Widmer in Brazil, and Ben Johnston and Herbert Brün at the University of Illinois, USA, in the 70's, he became a professor at the Universidade Federal da Bahia, and held several positions such as Director of the Music School (1988–1992) and Assistant Provost (1996–2002). Two doctoral degrees: one devoted to the pedagogy of music composition, leading to the Copene Prize 1999 and to the publication of a book,. the other to the analysis of octatonic strategies in the output of Ernst Widmer, leading to the publication of an article in Latin American Music Review. Most important prizes and commissions: Vitae Foundation (1995), American Composers Orchestra (1996), Secretary of Culture-Bahia (2009) and Ministry of Culture-Funarte (2012, 2014 and 2016). Some recent important events: premiere with UFRJ Orchestra (Bahia Concerto op. 98), premiere with Orquestra Sinfônica de São Paulo (Cabinda: We are black op. 104, 16.04.2015), premiere with Neojibá Orchestra (Seven arrows op. 102, 10.10.2015), Teatro Municipal (Rio de Janeiro), the III FMCB (performance of 15 works, 16 to 19.03.16), a Festival held at Campinas University, dedicated to his life and work, premiere at the Festival für Neue Musik - Essen/Germany (Cauíza for 10 percussionists, 22.10.2017), and also in five other cities in the Düsseldorf area. He has mentored a new generation of Brazilian composers such as Guilherme Bertissolo, Paulo Rios Filho, Alex Pochat, Tulio Augusto, Vinicius Amaro, Paulo Cesar Santana and Danniel Ferraz.

In recent years he has proposed the notion of compositionality – the attributes of that which is composed – involving at least five dimensions: i) the ‘invention of worlds’ (i.e. universes of meaning); ii) the ‘commitment to critique’, in the sense that composition requires the construction of interpretation; iii) ‘reciprocity’ or playing with identities - the fact that the designer creates the design as much as the design creates the designer, see Laske (1991); iv) the continuous interaction between theory and practice, there is no such a thing as compositional practice, or theory-free composition; v) and a ‘field of choices’, the place in which all these perspectives manifest themselves as potential freedom. These same instances also take part of the analytical process, which he also classifies as creative thinking, not only the traditional conception of reducing the whole to its constituent parts, but also, and specially, the challenge of identifying (i.e. composing) synthesis that respond to the top-down analytical work.

From 2005 to 2008 participated of the political life of the city of Salvador as President of the Fundação Gregório de Mattos (2003–2008), the cultural office of the city. His administration designed new formats for popular participation such as the Program Mestres Populares da Cultura, which led to the identification and recognition of elderly people with wide knowledge of ethnic-popular traditions, being considered an important contribution to cultural policies and management in Bahia. For him, teaching, writing (texts and music) and management activities are unified by the compositional challenges they involve, closely connected to the political needs of present times. Two examples: in 2005 he organized a cultural manifestation involving 456 capoeira performers, walking and dancing on the streets of Salvador, in order to celebrate the anniversary of the city, but also the adoption of specific cultural policies, by the Ministry of Culture, for this important Bahian and Brazilian cultural activity; in 2001 he was the general Coordinator of a huge program of cultural activities in Salvador, as part of the SBPC Congress (Brazilian Society for the Progress of Science) Sociedade Brasileira para o Progresso da Ciência, reinforcing the ideal of proximity between arts and sciences. In 2015, the National Foundation for the Arts (FUNARTE-Ministry of Culture) consulted around 120 Brazilian composers and conductors in order to prepare a list of 30 commissions for the XXIth Biennial of Brazilian Contemporary Music. He obtained the highest number of indications, being classified as the first prize, a clear demonstration of his national prestige and reputation.

In 1976 he married Ana Margarida de Almeida Cerqueira Lima (violinist and also Professor of the School of Music - UFBA) and had two sons - Cláudio and Maurício.

References
Notes

References
ABC da Fundação Gregório de Mattos (2008) 
Academia Brasileira de Música, 
Academia de Letras da Bahia, 
Academia de Ciências da Bahia, 
Béhague, Gerard. Recent Studies of Brazilian Music: Review-Essay Latin American Music Review. Volume 23, Number 2, Fall/Winter 2002, pp. 235–251 
Catalogue: XXI Bienal de Música Contemporânea Brasileira; indication of Paulo Costa Lima for the first prize in 2015 (p. 38) 
Composition in Bahia: Ernst Widmer and his octatonic strategies 
III FMCB 
FGM - Mestres Populares da Cultura, 
Grove Dictionary of Music and Musicians (2001)
Latin American Music Review, vol. 22, number 2, Fall/Winter 2001, Univ. of Texas Press
Marin Alsop conducts premiere of Cabinda: we are black 
Mariz, Vasco. História da Música no Brasil. Rio de Janeiro, Nova Fronteira, 2000, p. 472.
Mestres Populares da Cultura, 
Nogueira, Ilza. 2016. Contemporary Knowledge and Musical Creation: Ethic and Paradigms. MUSICA THEORICA. Salvador: TeMA, 201602, p. 1-21. Analysis of Atotô do L'homme armé op. 39 
Oehmen, Helde. "Percussion: Virtuosität und Perfektion", 11. Oktober 2017. Review of the premiere of Cauiza in Germany 
Paulo Costa Lima apresenta 'Sete Flechas' 
Paulo Rios Filho 
São Paulo Symphony Orchestra, Premieres 2015 (estreias 2015), free download of Cabinda op. 104 
SBPC Cultural, 2001, Salvador 
Sonus: A Journal of Investigations into Global Musical Possibilities, vol. 21, n.2, Spring 2001.

Books
Seminários de Carnaval I. Salvador: EDUFBA, 1988. v. '. 209 p. (Org.)
Seminários de Carnaval II. Salvador: EDUFBA, 1998. v. 1. 248 p. (Org.)
O Ensino de Composição Musical na Bahia (1999)
Ernst Widmer e o ensino de composição musical na Bahia. Salvador: Copene-Fazcultura, 1999, 358 p.
Quem Faz Salvador? Salvador: UFBA; Pró-Reitoria de Extensão, 2002. v. 1. 348 p. (Org.)
Invenção e Memória. Salvador: Edufba, 2005, 312 p. available at 
Musica Popular e Adjacências. Salvador: Edufba, 2010, available at 
Música Popular e outras Adjacências. Salvador: Edufba, 2012, 
Teoria e Prática do Compor I. Salvador: Edufba, 2012, available at: 
Teoria e Prática do Compor II. Salvador: Edufba, 2014, available at 
Teoria e Prática do Compor III: Lugar de fala e memória. Salvador, Edufba, 2016
Teoria e Prática do Compor IV: Horizontes metodológicos. Edufba, 2016.

Albums
Outros Ritmos. Salvador, Prêmio Copene, 1996
José Eduardo Martins 60 (Imikaiá e Ponteio-Estudo), 1998
Impressionem (Kreuzberg Records), Matias de Oliveira Pinto (Corrente de Xangô), 1997
Uma festa brasileira (Ed. Paulus 1998), José Ananias e Edelton Gloeden (Apanhe o Jegue e Lembrando e Esquecendo Pixinguinha)
XI Festival de Música Instrumental da Bahia (Ibejis for flute and clarinet), 2003
Bossa nova series (live) Antonio Eduardo Santos (Eis Aqui), 2003

Articles
"Group of Composers of Bahia" 
"Invenção e Memória: Celebração da Diversidade". Salvador-FUNCEB, Revista da Bahia, v.32, p. 25 - 37, 2004.
"Pesquisa em Educação Musical: a natureza da problematização (premissas)". Salvador, Revista da Faced, Universidade Federal da Bahia., p. 149 - 162, 2004.
"Composition and Cultural Identity in Bahia", (SONUS-Boston). Sonus A Journal of Investigations Into Global Musical Possibilities., v.21, p. 61 - ISSN, 2001.
Surface and Structure in the Music of Ernst Widmer: Octatonic Compositional Strategies (Abs). Music Theory Online., 2001.
"Composition in Bahia, Brazil: Ernst Widmer and his Octatonic Strategies" (LAMR). Latin American Music Review, v.22, p. 157 - 182, 2001.
"Brazilian Musical Libido". Journal for The Psychoanalisys of Culture and Society JCPS, v.1, p. 140 - 142, 1996.
"Bananas ao vento".Salvador-FUNCEB, Revista da Bahia., p. 40 - 45, 1998.
"Música e Psicanálise: Uma Possível Interface". Cadernos de Análise Musical, p. 58 - 73, 1996.
"Música, um Paraíso Familiar e Inacessível". São Paulo, Instituto Saede Sapientiae, Percurso. Revista de Psicanálise., v.Ano 8, p. 55 - 64, 1995.
"Análise de Transformações Temáticas na op.11/n.1 de Arnold Schönberg". São Paulo, Revista Música., v.4, p. 157 - 173, 1993.

Performances
 (2017) Campinas - SP, Serenata-Ponteio for string orchestra (2007), Oficina de Cordas with Lars Hoefs, 15.09.2017 (premiere)
 (2017) Campinas - SP, Chega de Caboclo for percussion group (2017), ANPPOM 2017 Congress, 01.09.2017
 (2017) Rio de Janeiro, Look at the sky for clarinet solo (2016), Igor Carvalho, Espaço Guiomar Novaes, ABM-Brasilianas 2017, 29.08.2017
 (2017) Salvador, Apanhe o Jegue for flute and guitar (1995), Lucas Robatto e Vladimir Bomfim, Museu de Arte da Bahia, 12.08.2017
 (2017) Toulouse - França, Corrente de Xangô for cello solo (1992), 'Eglise de Blaucau', with Lars Hoefs, 11.08.2017
 (2017) Turnê Sonora Brasil (20 cidades brasileiras), Bembé (2017), for brass quintet, August–December 2017 (estreia)
 (2017) Berlin, Kulturelle Landpartie, Cavalo Marinho (2016), por Matias de Oliveira Pinto, 26.05.2017 e 27.05.2017 (estreia)
 (2017) Campinas, Chega de Caboclo (2017) for percussion group, GRUPU com Fernando Hashimoto (Regente), I Congresso Brasileiro de Percussão, UNICAMP, 09.05.2017 (estreia)
 (2017) Krakow Cello Spring Festival, Corrente de Xangô (1992), with Lars Hoefs, Aula Florianka, Cracóvia (Polônia), 24.02.2017
 (2017) 3rd annual Villa-Lobos International Chamber Music Festival, Manteiga for sax and piano (2016), Michael Couper(sax) e Alexandra Albert(piano), Univ. of California - Riverside (USA), 02.02.2017 (estreia)
 (2017) 3rd annual Villa-Lobos International Chamber Music Festival, Corrente de Xangô for cello solo (1995), Lars Hoefs, Mimoda Studio, Pico Boulevard, Los Angeles (USA), 11.01.2017
 (2017) Lançamento do CD Festival Música Nova, includes Divertimento Mineral for sextet(2007), Regente: Jack Fortner e Camerata, SESC-Santos, Santos (SP), 20.01.2017
 (2016) 50º Festival Música Nova Gilberto Mendes, Look at the sky for clarinet and piano (2016), Igor Picchi Toledo (clarineta) e Rodrigo Antonio Silva (piano), Ribeirão Preto (SP), 11.11.2016
 (2016) III FMCB - Festival de Música Contemporânea Brasileira, dedicated to the life and work of composers Paulo Costa Lima and Ronaldo Miranda, UNICAMP-Campinas (SP), 16–19 March 2016
(2016) Teatro Castro Mendes - Campinas (SP) - 'Abertura Ayó' e 'Cabinda: we are black', Orquestra de Campinas with Ricardo Bologna
(2016) Sala da Tulha - USP Ribeirão Preto (SP) - 'Look at the sky' for clarinet and piano and 'ABoio II' for flute solo - Festival Música Nova
(2015) Sala São Paulo - São Paulo, Cabinda: we are black op. 104, OSESP with Marin Alsop.
(2015) Teatro Municipal do Rio de Janeiro - Sete flechas op. 102, Orquestra Neojibá with Eduardo Torres and Aleyson Scopel (piano)
(2014) Goethe Institut - Salvador, Zaziê Quartettsatz, with Mivos Quartet
(2013) Sala Leopoldo Miguez - Rio de Janeiro, 'Bahia Concerto op. 98', Orquestra de Cordas-UFRJ com Cláudio Cruz, Aleyson Scopel (piano)
(2010) Ziriguidum for percussion, USA-Tourné (20 universities of the East Coast), Grupo PIAP com John Boudler
(2009) Musée Cantini - Festival International des Musiques D'Aujourd'hui, Aboio op. 65 with Andrea Ernest (flute)
(2008) Teatro Castro Alves - Salvador (Brasil), estréia da Serenata Ayó for Orchestra, with OSBA and Erick Vasconcellos
(2007) Leitheimer Schlosskonzerte, Donaueschingen (Germany), Corrente de Xangô for cello solo, with Matias de Oliveira Pinto
(2006) Reitoria da UFBA-Salvador, Caipiroska, Duo Diorama (violin and piano)
(2005) Konzerthaus - Berlim, Modern Art Sextet
(2005) Teatro Castro Alves, Orquestra Sinfônica da Bahia, Eine Kleine Atotô Musik
(2003) Université D'Évry, France, Amphi Audiovisuel, Zelia Chueke (piano)
(2003) Festival Antasten, Hollbrich, Deutschland, Ponteio n.2, Silvia Belfiore (piano);
(2002) Princeton University Chapel, Princeton University, Duo Chorinho, Laura Ronai e Tom Moore (flutes)
(2002) Viva Musica, Benaroya Hall, Atotô de l'homme armé op. 39, Seattle Symphonic Orchestra, Alastair Willis (Conductor);
(2001) Lincoln Center, Alice Tully Hall, Atotô de l’homme armé op. 39, New Juilliard Ensemble, Joel Sachs (conductor);
(2001) New York Public Library, Donnel Auditorium, Vés, Zelia Chueke (piano)
(2000) Sala São Paulo (2000), Orquestra Sinfônica do Estado de São Paulo, Serenata Kabila, John Neschling (conductor)
(2000) School of Music, University of Washington, Pega essa nêga e chêra for flute and piano, Lucas Robatto (flute)
(2000) Palazzo Santacroce, Instituto Ítalo-Americano, Vés, Margherita Traversa (piano)
(1998) Brazilian-American Institute, Washington D.C., Oriki de Erinlê, Adélia Issa e Edelton Gloeden (soprano and piano);
(1998) Universidade de Sapposo-Japan, Corrente de Xangô, Matias de Oliveira Pinto (cellist)
(1998) University of Hiroshima-Japan, Corrente de Xangô, Matias de Oliveira Pinto (cellist)
(1997) Victoria Summer Music Festival, Canadá, Ibejis for flute and clarinet, Lucas Robatto e Pedro Robatto
(1997) Sala Rode Pompe, Gent-Belgium, Vassourinhas for piano solo, José Eduardo Martins (piano)
(1996) Carnegie Hall, American Composers Orchestra, Atotô do l'homme armé (Paul Lustig Dunkel, conductor)
(1991) Summergarden Festival, New York City, Pega essa nêga e chêra! for piano; (Cf. Alex Ross, New York Times);

Works
Nde re he America: Cantos e Lutas (2021, Commissioned by the Contest 'La Flauta Latinoamericana')
Maianguelê for flute quartet (2021)
Ninu Afefe (in partnership with Iuri Passos) for Rum/Pi/Lê/Gan, 2 trumpets and Orquestra (2021)
Ojí: Chegança e Ímpeto for Orchestra (2019, Commissioned by Orquestra Sinfônica de São Paulo)
Serenta Gonguê for oboe and piano (2018)
Calcinha New Stuck for 3 sopranos and percussion group (2018)
Aboio 3 for flute solo (2018)
Chega de Caboclo for percussion group (2017, Commissioned by GRUPU-UNICAMP)
Tindolelê for piano (2016)
Manteiga for tenor sax and piano (2016)
Kekitem for brass quintet (2016)
Tempuê for Orchestra (2016)
Cavalo Marinho for cello solo (2016)
Trans-Iakisôbá for flute, clarinet and piano (2016)
Look at the sky for clarinet and piano (2016)
Look at the sky for clarinet solo (2016)
Rapadura e Côco for cello solo (2016)
Aboio e Pós-Aboio for cello solo (2016)
Trans-Iakisôbá (Ibejis n. 3) for flute and clarinet (2015)
Cabinda:we are black for Orchestra (2015)
Zaziê Quartettsatz for String Quartet (2014)
Sete Flechas: um batuque concertante (2014-2015) for piano and Orchestra
Manteiga for sax solo (2013)
The real thing for would-be clarinet and piano (2013)
A Bahia tá viva? for soprano and chamber group (2012)
Bahia Concerto 2012 for piano and string Orchestra (2012)
Yêlêlá Song for voice, clarinet and piano (2012)
Januário para duo de percussão (2012) 
Aboio II for flute solo (2012)
Ibejis n. 2 for flute and clarinet (2011)
Calcinha Stück for 3 sopranos and percussion group (2010)
Paisagem Baiana para 5 clarinets (2010)
Só... for quintet de fl, cl, tp, vn, vc (2009)
Yêlelá Twendê para 2 sop, bx elétrico, pc e Orquestra (2009)
Divertimento Mineral para sexteto (fl, cl, tp, vn, vc, pn) (2007)
Fantasia for strings (2007)
Ziriguidum for percussion group (2007)
Partita for violoncelo solo (2006)
Concertino for clarinet and strings (2006)
Serenata Ayó for Orchestra (2005)
Brincando com a louça for sextet (fl, cl, vn, vla, vc, pn) (2004)
Eis Aqui! for piano solo (2003)
Arroubos para flauta solo, duo, trio e quarteto (2003)
Aboio I for flute solo (2003)
Ponteio n. 2 for piano solo (2002)
Ciclo de Orikis op. 60: Xangô, Exu e Oxossi (sop, fl, pn, pc) (2001)
3 Ponteios em miniatura for flute and piano (2000)
Oriki de Erinlê para soprano and guitar (texto recolhido por Verger) (1997)
Lembrando e esquecendo Pixinguinha for flute and guitar (1997)
Vassourinhas um frevo-estudo for piano solo (1996)
Kabila para wind quartet (1996)
Oriki para trumpet and piano (1995)
Apanhe o Jegue for flute and guitar (1995)
Ibeji for flute and clarinet (1995)
Atotô do L’homme armé for chamber orchestra (1993)
Kyrie de Nanã para choir (1993)
Saruê de dois for two clarinets (1993)
Ponteio for piano solo (1992)
Corrente de Xangô for violoncelo solo (1992)
Imikaiá for piano solo (1992)
Pega essa nêga e chêra for piano solo (1991)
Pega essa nêga e chêra for flute and piano (1991)
Vés for piano solo (1990)
Atotô balzare, Si, Si, como no! for 5 pc e piano (1985)
Cuncti-Serenata for piano solo (1984)
Ubabá, o que diria Bach! for chamber orchestra (1983)

External links

Brazilian composers
Living people
1954 births
People from Salvador, Bahia